The 1926–27 season was the 52nd season of competitive football in England.

Overview
This was the season in which George Camsell scored an astounding 59 goals in 37 league appearances for Middlesbrough

Honours

Notes = Number in parentheses is the times that club has won that honour. * indicates new record for competition

Football League

First Division

Second Division

Third Division North

Third Division South

Top goalscorers

First Division
Jimmy Trotter (The Wednesday) – 37 goals

Second Division
George Camsell (Middlesbrough) – 59 goals

Third Division North
Albert Whitehurst (Rochdale) – 44 goals

Third Division South
Harry Morris (Swindon Town) – 47 goals

FA Cup
The 1927 FA Cup Final was won by Cardiff City, who beat Arsenal 1–0.

National team
The England national football team had a successful season, drawing first place in the 1927 British Home Championship with Scotland and then winning all three matches of a tour to France and the Low Countries, scoring twenty goals and only conceding three in return.

European tour

References